King Edward VI Community College (KEVICC) is a coeducational secondary school and sixth form located in Totnes, Devon, England. It is located in the Dart Valley on the A385 Ashburton Road and serves Totnes and the surrounding area. It has a large campus with around 900 students, 200 of whom are at the Kennicott Sixth Form centre adjoining the main site.

History

The school was founded in 1966 as the King Edward VI Comprehensive School, an amalgamation of the King Edward VI Grammar School for boys (founded 1554), the Redworth Secondary Modern School and the Totnes High School for Girls. The new school was located on the sites of the Redworth Secondary Modern and the neighbouring Totnes High School for Girls. The grammar school had been on a different site ("The Mansion" on Fore Street), which was too small to accommodate the new comprehensive school.

The school received its most recent Ofsted report in 2019, where it scored a 'Good'.

Previously a community school administered by Devon County Council, in September 2022 King Edward VI Community College converted to academy status. The school is now sponsored by Education South West.

Curriculum
The school curriculum follows the National Curriculum of England and Wales and offers French and Spanish for a compulsory modern foreign language. Students choose 4 GCSE subjects, alongside Maths, English Language, English Literature, Science and Physical Education, which are all compulsory. Students also have the option of studying the English Baccalaureate (EBacc).

The school also has Kennicott sixth form for students to take A Levels, AS Levels, BTEC National Diplomas and EPQs.

College houses
The school currently has five houses: Babbage, Davis, Gyles, Scott and Snape.

These took over from the previous four-school house system of Rea, Smythe, Jeffrey and Scott in 2001.

Notable former teachers
 Thomas Peter Snape OBE (4 June 1925 - 30 April 1997), headmaster from 1964–83; General Secretary from 1983-88 of both the Secondary Heads Association and the Headmasters’ Conference.

Notable former pupils

 Joanna Briscoe, novelist
 Ben Howard, singer-songwriter 
 Hester Goodman, musician; member of The Ukulele Orchestra of Great Britain
 Joseph Mount, of the band Metronomy
 Sam and Sophie Tolchard, bowls players and 2014 Commonwealth Games medallists
 Cosmo Jarvis (attended sixth form), singer-songwriter
 Kieffer Moore, footballer
 Ryan Stevenson, cricketer
 Jimmy Cauty, musician and artist
 Cressida Bowyer, musician and scientist
 Toby Young, son of Lord Young of Dartington, journalist
 Warwick Lightfoot, Conservative politician
 Guy Singh-Watson, organic farmer, Riverford Farm
 Mary Nightingale, journalist and news presenter
 Cathryn Harrison, actress

Pupils of the Boys' Grammar school
Charles Babbage, inventor of the computer
Philip Furneaux, an English independent minister.
Benjamin Kennicott, an English churchman and Hebrew scholar.
Edward Lye, an 18th-century scholar of Old English and Germanic philology.

References

External links

 Old Totnesians Society

Secondary schools in Devon
Academies in Devon
Totnes
King Edward VI Schools
Educational institutions established in 2018
2018 establishments in England